Analog or analogue may refer to:

Computing and electronics
 Analog signal, in which information is encoded in a continuous variable
 Analog device, an apparatus that operates on analog signals
 Analog electronics, circuits which use analog signals
 Analog computer, a computer that uses analog signals
 Analog recording, information recorded using an analog signal
 Functional analog (electronic), a system that fulfills the same function as another
 Structural analog (electronic), a system that has the same structure as another

Entertainment

Albums and songs
 Analog (album), an album by Eureka Farm
 "Analog" (song), a song by Tyler, The Creator, featuring Hodgy Beats, from Goblin
 Analogue (album), a 2005 album by A-ha
 "Analogue" (All I Want), the title track of the 2005 album by A-ha

Books and magazines
 Analog Science Fiction and Fact, a science-fiction magazine
 ANALOG Computing, a 1981–1989 magazine about Atari computers
 Analogue: A Hate Story, a 2012 visual novel by Christine Love

Other entertainment
 Analogue (literature), a literary work that shares motifs, characters or events with another but is not directly derived from it
 Analogue (theatre company), British
 Analog (TV series), a Canadian television series (1971–1972)

Other
 Analogue (company)
 Analog Devices, a semiconductor company
 Analog (program), a computer program that analyzes log files from web servers
 Analogical models, a method of representing a phenomenon of the world by another, more understandable or analyzable system
 Functional analog (chemistry), a compound with similar properties
 Structural analog, a compound with an altered chemical structure
 Substrate analog, a compound that resembles the substrate in an enzymatic reaction

See also
 Analogy (disambiguation)
 Analog Man (disambiguation)